Herxheim is a Verbandsgemeinde ("collective municipality") in the Südliche Weinstraße district, in Rhineland-Palatinate, Germany. The seat of the municipality is in Herxheim.

The Verbandsgemeinde Herxheim consists of the following Ortsgemeinden ("local municipalities"):

 Herxheim bei Landau/Pfalz
 Herxheimweyher 
 Insheim 
 Rohrbach

Verbandsgemeinde in Rhineland-Palatinate
Südliche Weinstraße